Garrick Frederick Mattheus (born 23 March 1996) is a South African rugby union player for the  in the Currie Cup and the Rugby Challenge. His regular position is fly-half, but he can also play as a fullback. In 2020 passed at Rugby club Valpolicella.

Rugby career

Youth rugby

Mattheus was born in Port Elizabeth, where he attended Grey High School. In 2014, he was selected to represent Eastern Province at the Under-18 Academy Week held in Worcester. His best performance of the tournament came in his first match, as he kicked three penalties and five conversions for a personal points haul of 19 points in their 49–31 victory over the Pumas. Later in the same year, Mattheus was also drafted into the  squad that competed for their 2014 Under-19 Provincial Championship campaign.

However, he lasted just 21 minutes of the match before being suffering a concussion and didn't feature in their next six matches. He made his return as a replacement in their 34–22 victory against  and started their 29–10 victory over  a week later. He was used as a replacement in their final two matches of the regular season against the s and the s, as Eastern Province finished top of the log, winning eleven of their twelve matches during the season. Mattheus also played off the bench in their 31–15 semi-final victory over Free State, as well in the final, which Eastern Province won by beating the Blue Bulls 25–23 in Johannesburg to win the competition for the first time in their history.

Eastern Province Kings

In 2016, Mattheus was included in the  squad that played in the 2016 Currie Cup qualification series. It took him just four minutes into his debut to score his first points by kicking his first of four penalties in the match. He also scored a conversion to contribute 14 of his team's 19 points in the win. He finished the competition as the Kings' top scorer with 66 points in his eight appearances.

References

South African rugby union players
Living people
1996 births
Rugby union players from Port Elizabeth
Rugby union fly-halves
Rugby union fullbacks
Eastern Province Elephants players
Boland Cavaliers players
Blue Bulls players